Ek Khiladi Ek Haseena (English: A Player, A Beautiful Woman) is an Indian reality TV dance series broadcast on Colors TV in 2008. The series was hosted by Sandhya Mridul and judged by Sushmita Sen and a former Pakistani cricketer Wasim Akram.

Concept
The show was a reality dance contest with six couples as the participants. Each couple consisted of one Indian cricketer and one movie celebrity. The first season was won by Harbhajan Singh and Mona Singh.

Contestants
 Pair 1: S Sreesanth and Surveen Chawla
 Pair 2: Harbhajan Singh and Mona Singh (Winners)
 Pair 3: Irfan Pathan and Ashima Bhalla
 Pair 4: Dinesh Karthik and Nigaar Khan
 Pair 5: Nikhil Chopra and Barkha Bisht
 Pair 6: Vinod Kambli and Shama Sikander

References

Colors TV original programming
Indian reality television series
2008 Indian television series debuts
2008 Indian television series endings